Heide Gluesing-Luerssen (born 1961) is a German mathematician specializing in algebraic coding theory. She is currently the Royster Research Professor at University of Kentucky.

Education and career
Gluesing-Luerssen earned her doctorate in 1991 from the University of Bremen, and taught in the mathematics department of the University of Oldenburg from 1993 to 2004. While there, she completed a habilitation in 2000. She moved to the University of Groningen in 2004, and to Kentucky in 2007.

Contributions
She is the author of the book Linear delay-differential systems with commensurate delays: an algebraic approach (Lecture Notes in Mathematics 1770, Springer-Verlag, 2002).

References

21st-century German mathematicians
German women mathematicians
Kentucky women mathematicians
Living people
University of Bremen alumni
Academic staff of the University of Oldenburg
University of Kentucky faculty
1961 births
21st-century women mathematicians
21st-century German women
21st-century American women